The Ojo Caliente Hot Springs Round Barn is in Ojo Caliente, New Mexico and was built in 1924. It is the only adobe round barn in the United States.

History 
The barn was built by Anthony F. Joseph, the owner and manager of the Ojo Caliente Hot Springs. By the mid-1910s, the mineral resort experienced growth and increased popularity and the barn was needed to meet a growing need for dairy products at the mineral resort. The ability to provide dairy products signifies a move towards commercial production from subsistence home production. By providing dairy products to guests, the resort was able to provide convenience and reassurance.

The hay hood dormer over the barn door was added by later owners, when the original opening there, flush with the domed roof shape, proved too exposed.

It was restored in 2002, and listed on the National Register of Historic Places in 2003. At the time of its NRHP listing, it was believed to be the only round barn in New Mexico. It is within sight of U.S. Route 285.

See also

National Register of Historic Places listings in Taos County, New Mexico

References

Infrastructure completed in 1924
Round barns in New Mexico
Barns with hay hoods
Adobe buildings and structures in New Mexico
Barns on the National Register of Historic Places in New Mexico
National Register of Historic Places in Taos County, New Mexico
1924 establishments in New Mexico